The Astrakhan electoral district was a constituency created for the 1917 Russian Constituent Assembly election. The electoral district covered parts of the Astrakhan Governorate, excluding the areas of the Bukey Horde and the Kalmyk Steppe.

Results

The account of U.S. historian Oliver Henry Radkey (used for the table above) is incomplete, with some votes missing. In Astrakhan town, the Bolsheviks got 9,556 votes (27.5%), the Kadets 8,981 votes (25.8%), the Muslim list 6,376 votes (18.3%), the SRs 4,310 votes (12.4%), the Cossack list 3,900 votes (11.2%), the Mensheviks 1,486 votes (4.3%) and the Popular Socialists 191 votes (0.5%). The Bolsheviks won 53.4% of the votes in the Astrakhan garrison.

References

Electoral districts of the Russian Constituent Assembly election, 1917